The 1974 NBA draft was the 28th annual draft of the National Basketball Association (NBA). The draft was held on May 28, 1974, before the 1974–75 season. In this draft, 18 NBA teams took turns selecting amateur U.S. college basketball players and other eligible players, including international players. The first two picks in the draft belonged to the teams that finished last in each conference, with the order determined by a coin flip. The Portland Trail Blazers won the coin flip and were awarded the first overall pick, while the Philadelphia 76ers were awarded the second pick. The remaining first-round picks and the subsequent rounds were assigned to teams in reverse order of their win–loss record in the previous season. Prior to the draft, the Capital Bullets were renamed the Washington Bullets. An expansion franchise, the New Orleans Jazz, took part in the NBA Draft for the first time and were assigned the tenth pick in each round. A player who had finished his four-year college eligibility was eligible for selection. If a player left college early, he would not be eligible for selection until his college class graduated. Before the draft, 20 college underclassmen were declared eligible for selection under the "hardship" rule. These players had applied and gave evidence of financial hardship to the league, which granted them the right to start earning their living by starting their professional careers earlier. The draft consisted of 10 rounds comprising the selection of 178 players.

Draft selections and draftee career notes

Bill Walton, from the University of California Los Angeles, was selected first overall by the Portland Trail Blazers. Jamaal Wilkes, (then known as Keith Wilkes) from UCLA,   was selected 11th by the Golden State Warriors and went on to win the Rookie of the Year Award. Walton, Wilkes, and 40th pick George Gervin have been inducted to the Basketball Hall of Fame. Both Walton and Gervin were also named to the list of the 50 Greatest Players in NBA History announced at the league's 50th anniversary in 1996. Walton won the NBA championship, along with the Finals Most Valuable Player Award, with the Blazers in 1977. Later in his career, he won another NBA title with the Boston Celtics in 1986. During that season, he also won the Sixth Man of the Year Award. Walton's other achievements include one Most Valuable Player Award in 1978, two All-NBA Team selections and two All-Star Game selections. Gervin had left college in 1972 to play professionally in the American Basketball Association (ABA) with the Virginia Squires. He later joined the NBA in 1976 after both leagues merged. His achievements include two All-ABA Team selections, seven All-NBA Team selections, three ABA All-Star Game selections and nine NBA All-Star Game selections.

Jamaal Wilkes won four NBA championships, one with the Golden State Warriors and three with the Los Angeles Lakers, and was selected to three All-Star Games. Maurice Lucas, the 14th pick, was selected to one All-NBA Team and four All-Star Games. He also won the NBA championship in 1977 with the Trail Blazers. Truck Robinson, the 22nd pick, and Phil Smith, the 29th pick, were selected to one All-NBA Team and two All-Star Games each. Bobby Jones, the 5th pick, initially opted to play in the ABA. He played two seasons in the ABA before finally joined the NBA with the Denver Nuggets when both leagues merged. His achievements include an NBA championship with the 76ers in 1983, one All-ABA Team selection, one ABA All-Star Game selection, four NBA All-Star Game selections, nine NBA All-Defensive Team selections and one Sixth Man of The Year Award. Five other players from this draft, 6th pick Scott Wedman, 8th pick Campy Russell, 12th pick Brian Winters, 21st pick Billy Knight and 25th pick John Drew, were also selected to at least one All-Star Game. Two players drafted went on to have coaching careers in the NBA: Brian Winters and 45th pick Kim Hughes.

Key

Draft

Other picks
The following list includes other draft picks who have appeared in at least one NBA game.

Trades
 On the draft-day, the Seattle SuperSonics acquired a first-round pick from the Cleveland Cavaliers in exchange for Dick Snyder and a first-round pick. The Sonics used the pick to draft Tommy Burleson. The Cavaliers used the pick to draft Campy Russell.
 On May 20, 1974, the Atlanta Hawks acquired Bob Kauffman, Dean Meminger, the tenth pick, a 1975 first-round pick, 1975 and 1976 second-round picks, and a 1980 third-round pick from the New Orleans Jazz in exchange for Pete Maravich. The Hawks used the pick to draft Mike Sojourner.
 On the draft-day, the Chicago Bulls acquired a first-round pick from the New York Knicks in exchange for Howard Porter and a 1975 second-round pick. The Bulls used the pick to draft Maurice Lucas.
 On August 31, 1972, the Los Angeles Lakers acquired a second-round pick from the Cleveland Cavaliers in exchange for Jim Cleamons. The Lakers used the pick to draft Billy Knight.
 On August 23, 1973, the Washington Bullets (as the Capital Bullets) acquired a second-round pick from the Los Angeles Lakers in exchange for Stan Love. Previously, the Lakers acquired the pick on September 19, 1972, from the Phoenix Suns in exchange for Paul Stovall. The Bullets used the pick to draft Truck Robinson.
 On September 10, 1973, the Chicago Bulls acquired John Hummer and a second-round pick from the Buffalo Braves in exchange for Gar Heard, Kevin Kunnert and a 1975 second-round pick. The Bulls used the pick to draft Leon Benbow.
 On October 30, 1973, the Phoenix Suns acquired Keith Erickson and a second-round pick from the Los Angeles Lakers in exchange for Connie Hawkins. The Suns used the pick to draft Fred Saunders.
 On October 14, 1973, the Portland Trail Blazers acquired a second-round pick from the Chicago Bulls in exchange for Rick Adelman. The Blazers used the pick to draft Phil Lumpkin.
 On September 11, 1972, the Portland Trail Blazers acquired a second-round pick from the Philadelphia 76ers as compensation for the signing of Gary Gregor as a free agent. Previously, the 76ers acquired the pick and future consideration (the 76ers acquired John Block on July 28, 1972) on December 13, 1971, from the Milwaukee Bucks in exchange for Wali Jones. The Blazers used the pick to draft Rubin Collins.
 On October 24, 1972, the Cleveland Cavaliers acquired a third-round pick from the Portland Trail Blazers in exchange for Charlie Davis. The Cavaliers used the pick to draft Foots Walker.
 On January 26, 1973, the Philadelphia 76ers acquired Tom Van Arsdale and a third-round pick from the Kansas City-Omaha Kings in exchange for John Block. The 76ers used the pick to draft Harvey Catchings.
 On October 9, 1973, the Phoenix Suns acquired 1974 and 1975 third-round picks from the Washington Bullets (as the Capital Bullets) in exchange for Walt Wesley. The Suns used the pick to draft Earl Williams.

Early entrants

College underclassmen
The following college basketball players successfully applied for an NBA hardship.

  Gary Brokaw – G, Notre Dame (junior)
  Rubin Collins – G, Maryland Eastern Shore (junior)
  John Drew – F, Gardner–Webb (junior)
  Rudy Jackson – Hutchinson CC (sophomore)
  Maurice Lucas – F, Marquette (junior)
  Eric Money – G, Arizona (junior)
  Coniel Norman – G, Arizona (sophomore)
  Cliff Pondexter – F/C, Long Beach State (sophomore)
  Roscoe Pondexter – Long Beach State (junior)
  Campy Russell – Michigan (junior)
  Mike Sojourner – Utah (sophomore)
  Bobby Taylor – F, Cal State LA (freshman)

Notes

See also
 List of first overall NBA draft picks

References
General

Specific

External links
NBA.com
NBA.com: NBA Draft History

Draft
National Basketball Association draft
NBA draft
NBA draft
Basketball in New York City
Sporting events in New York City